Mohamed Diab Al-Attar, known as Ad-Diba, (‎; 17 November 1927 – 30 December 2016), was a footballer who played for the Al Ittihad Alexandria Club and the Egypt national football team. He later served as an international football referee. In 2007, he was named one of the 200 greatest African footballers.

Biography
Ad-Diba was born in Alexandria and joined the Al Ittihad Alexandria Club as a centre forward in 1944. In 1948 he helped the team win the Egypt Cup and was the top scorer in the first Egyptian Premier League tournament (alongside El-Sayed El-Dhizui). He remained with the team until 1958, when they were relegated to the Egyptian Second Division, and retired to take up refereeing. Internationally, he was a member of the Egypt national football team and competed at two editions of the Summer Olympic Games in 1948 and 1952. He also helped Egypt win the first edition of both football at the Pan Arab Games in 1953 and the Africa Cup of Nations in 1957. In the latter case, he was the tournament's top scorer with five goals, four of which came in Egypt's 4–0 victory over Ethiopia in the final.

As a referee, Ad-Diab presided over the final of the 1968 African Cup of Nations and also refereed during the 1972 Gulf Cup of Nations and the 1976 Summer Olympics. By career he was a water manager and a journalist. In 2007, he was included in an initial list by the Confederation of African Football of the top 200 African footballers of all time. In September 2016 it was reported that he was suffering from Alzheimer's disease and in critical condition in an Alexandria hospital. He died on 30 December 2016 at the age of 89.

References

1927 births
2016 deaths
Egyptian footballers
Egypt international footballers
Olympic footballers of Egypt
Footballers at the 1948 Summer Olympics
Footballers at the 1952 Summer Olympics
1957 African Cup of Nations players
Africa Cup of Nations-winning players
Egyptian football referees
Sportspeople from Alexandria
Association football forwards